Ben Corday (1875 - 1938) was an American tattoo artist and actor. He is known for being a prolific tattoo flash artist and a progenitor of modern tattooing.

Life and Impact

Ben Corday was born in 1875. While his obituary listed Singapore as his place of birth, a report of his U.S. citizenship application stated that Corday was born in Lucknow, India. A British subject, Corday began a life at sea when he ran away at the age of 14 to work on a sailing ship. Shortly thereafter, Corday joined the Royal Marine Corps and then the Scots Guards, for whom he fought in the Second Boer War in South Africa. After leaving the military, Corday relocated to the United States, where he applied for citizenship in 1912. Afterward, Corday found work as a sideshow attraction in the Sells Floto Circus. A wrestler and actor, he appeared in two silent short films directed by Hal Roach.

A man of many trades, Ben Corday was mainly known for his career in tattooing, which he practiced after immigrating to the United States. Corday lived and tattooed in several, disparate locations. He is known to have tattooed in San Francisco, New York City, Australia and Los Angeles. What is known about Corday's obscure tattooing career is primarily left to the stories passed down by his peers. His mentor, American tattooer Bert Grimm, relayed several of these to San Francisco tattooer Lyle Tuttle. In these stories, Grimm portrayed Corday as both a prolific artist and notorious alcoholic who would sell off entire sets of tattoo flash before going on a drinking binge. When his funds were depleted, Corday would produce new art work and reopen his shop. Corday eventually settled in Los Angeles, where he tattooed on Main Street. He died in his sleep at his residence on nearby Hewitt Street in February 1938.

Corday was an influential tattoo artist and flash designer whose work is considered foundational to the era of modern tattooing. The Japanese-influenced style of Corday's designs, known for fine line work and subtle shading integrated with Western elements, was shared by contemporaries like George Burchett. Corday's name is known and highly regarded among American tattooers like Bert Grimm, Sailor Jerry, and Don Ed Hardy. Ben Corday's abundant flash, much of which he sold to tattooer Percy Waters, is widely circulated and continues to influence tattoo design.

Height 

While it is certain that Ben Corday was an imposingly large man, his actual height is of some dispute. An article published during Corday's stint in New York as a doorman declares his height to be 7 foot 5 inches and his weight 315 pounds. Corday's obituary in the Los Angeles Times lists him at 6 foot 10 inches and just under 300 pounds. Corday, when filling out his application for U.S. Citizenship, self-reported his height at 6 foot 8 inches.

References

External links 

 Ben Corday Artistry at Buzzworthy Tattoo History
 
 Ben Corday on The Tallest Man, a website about giants.

1875 births
American male actors
American tattoo artists
1938 deaths